Vic Seixas and Doris Hart were the defending champions, but Hart did not compete. Seixas competed with Shirley Fry, and they defeated Gardnar Mulloy and Althea Gibson in the final, 8–6, 2–6, 6–3 to win the mixed doubles tennis title at the 1956 Wimbledon Championships.

Seeds

  Vic Seixas /  Shirley Fry (champions)
  Luis Ayala /  Thelma Long (fourth round)
  Gardnar Mulloy /  Althea Gibson (final)
  Bob Howe /  Darlene Hard (semifinals)

Draw

Finals

Top half

Section 1

Section 2

Section 3

Section 4

Bottom half

Section 5

Section 6

Section 7

Section 8

References

External links

X=Mixed Doubles
Wimbledon Championship by year – Mixed doubles